Balthazar Bigirimana was a Burundian politician and diplomat.
Since 1995, he has been president of the Rally for the People of Burundi (RPB).
Bigirimana was an ethnic Hutu from Kirundo province.
From October 28, 2011 	to  he was Burundian Ambassador to Belgium.

References

2012 deaths
Rally for the People of Burundi politicians
Ambassadors of Burundi to Belgium
Hutu people
1955 births